Matysówka  is a former village in south-eastern Poland. It had a population of 1,157 before being abolished on the 1st of January, 2019 and incorporated into the neighbouring city of Rzeszów as its 31st osiedle. Administratively, it used to be under the jurisdiction of Gmina Tyczyn, within Rzeszów County, Subcarpathian Voivodeship.

References

Villages in Rzeszów County